East Volcano Islands is a small group of islands to the east of Great Andaman, all volcanic islands, located in the Andaman Sea.

Administration
Narcondam Island belongs to the North and Middle Andaman administrative district.

Transportation
Ferry service is available from Diglipur to Narcondam. Normally ship is available once a week, only authorized by police.

Demographics 
There is only 1 village, at Narcondam.

See also

References 

Archipelagoes of the Andaman and Nicobar Islands
North and Middle Andaman district